Oliba Seledina Nieves Arroyo  (born 1977-11-25 in Esmeraldas) is a female weightlifter from Ecuador. She won a gold medal at the 2007 Pan American Games for her native South American country in the + 75 kg weight division.

Career
Nieves won the gold medal of the 2007 Pan American Games +75 kg category. She won the gold medal of the 2012 Pre-Olympic Championship held in Guatemala, winning the berth to the 2012 Summer Olympics. Nieve finished in the eight place in the +75 kg category in London, after lifting 255 kg.

Nieves also won the bronze medal in the 2013 Bolivarian Games in Trujillo, Peru.

References

 the-sports.org
 Profile

External links

1977 births
Living people
Weightlifters at the 2003 Pan American Games
Weightlifters at the 2007 Pan American Games
Sportspeople from Esmeraldas, Ecuador
Olympic weightlifters of Ecuador
Weightlifters at the 2012 Summer Olympics
Ecuadorian female weightlifters
Weightlifters at the 2015 Pan American Games
Pan American Games gold medalists for Ecuador
Pan American Games silver medalists for Ecuador
Female powerlifters
Pan American Games medalists in weightlifting
South American Games gold medalists for Ecuador
South American Games silver medalists for Ecuador
South American Games medalists in weightlifting
Competitors at the 2010 South American Games
Medalists at the 2007 Pan American Games
Medalists at the 2015 Pan American Games
Pan American Weightlifting Championships medalists
21st-century Ecuadorian women
20th-century Ecuadorian women